Kerry Kenneth Ketter (born September 20, 1947) is a Canadian former ice hockey player. He played in the National Hockey League with the Atlanta Flames and the World Hockey Association with the Edmonton Oilers between 1972 and 1976. The rest of his career, which lasted from 1966 to 1976, was spent in various minor leagues.

Regular season and playoffs

Awards
 CMJHL Second All-Star Team – 1967

External links
 

1947 births
Living people
Atlanta Flames players
Baltimore Clippers players
Canadian ice hockey defencemen
Dallas Black Hawks players
Edmonton Oil Kings (WCHL) players
Edmonton Oilers (WHA) players
Fort Worth Wings players
Ice hockey people from British Columbia
Nova Scotia Voyageurs players
Omaha Knights (CHL) players
Sportspeople from Prince George, British Columbia